Sinem Kurtbay (born 24 May 1991) is a Finnish sailor. She competed in the Nacra 17 event at the 2020 Summer Olympics alongside Akseli Keskinen.

References

External links
 

1999 births
Living people
Finnish female sailors (sport)
Olympic sailors of Finland
Sailors at the 2020 Summer Olympics – Nacra 17